= Du Shangze =

Chinese politician and journalist (born 1981)

Du Shangze (Chinese: 杜尚泽; pinyin: Dù Shàngzé; born October 1981) is a Chinese journalist and politician, currently serving as deputy editor-in-chief of the People's Daily and director of its Politics and Culture Department.

== Biography ==
Du joined the People's Daily in 2004 and worked in its Domestic Politics Department, General Office, and International Department. She served as head of the paper's Beijing Branch.

In August 2025, she was appointed a member of the editorial board of the People's Daily and director of its Politics and Culture Department, while remaining head of the Beijing Branch.

In August 2026, she was appointed deputy editor-in-chief of the People's Daily, remaining concurrently director of the Politics and Culture Department, and became the first vice-ministerial-level official born in the 1980s.
